Trigon is a supervillain appearing in media published by DC Comics. He is one of the most powerful beings in the DC Universe, having enslaved many worlds. He is an adversary of the Teen Titans and the Justice League, the father and arch-enemy of the superhero Raven, and husband of the human Arella.

Publication history
Trigon first appeared in a cameo in New Teen Titans #2 (December 1980) and his first full appearance is New Teen Titans #4. He was created by Marv Wolfman and George Pérez.

Fictional character biography
A sadistic, cruel, dangerous, and powerful demon of inter and extra-dimensional origin, Trigon is a result of the mating between a female member of a mystic sect and the god they worshipped. A side effect of this pairing is that their child was filled with the cast-off evil energies of the inhabitants of Azarath, forming him into their personification. At birth, Trigon killed everyone around him (including his own mother); at the age of one, he ruled an entire planet, and at the age of six, he destroyed an entire planet. By the age of 30, he held dominion over millions of worlds in his dimension. There is some confusion regarding the origins of Trigon, as he claims to have existed as formless energy since the beginning of his own universe, while the energies cast off by Azar and Azarath simply allowed him to take physical form roughly a thousand years before DC's present day.

Arella was a depressed woman who decided to join a cult known as the Church of Blood that was trying to kill Trigon. When the ritual was performed, Trigon, disguised as a handsome male, emerged and married Arella. After making love, Arella discovered Trigon's true nature after seeing his true form. Trigon sends Arella back to Earth, and Arella is pregnant and on the brink of suicide when she is found by an extra-dimensional cult and is brought to Azarath, where she gives birth to their daughter Raven. Raven is brought up to "control her emotions" to suppress and control the demonic powers she inherited from Trigon. During this time, Trigon was aware of his daughter's whereabouts, but rarely intervened, except when a renegade monk named Juris attempted to cast Raven as an infant into another dimension to avert her potential threat; Trigon struck him down at the moment of the deed, and allowed the cult to keep her safe for the time being.

Raven learned of Trigon's intentions to conquer the Earth and vowed to stop him; she initially approached the Justice League, but they refused her on the advice of Zatanna, who sensed her demonic parentage. In desperation, she reformed the Teen Titans with several new members to fight her father. The team was eventually able to defeat Trigon and seal him in an interdimensional prison. However, Raven still had to fight her father's influence as he was not completely destroyed. 

Trigon eventually escaped and came to Earth, taking control of Raven and destroying Azarath in the process. The Titans came together and tried to fight Trigon, but were contaminated by his demonic influence and killed Raven; this allowed the souls of Azarath to possess her and use her as a channel to kill Trigon - the demonic possession had been part of a plan to defeat Trigon, as the Titans would never have killed Raven on their own — blasting him out of existence with a beam of purifying light. Although Trigon is gone, his followers (led by Brother Blood) have tried to revive him several times.

The Sons of Trigon

Raven notices that Trigon has returned and is responsible for the recent attacks on past and present members of the Teen Titans. The cause of his resurrection from the dead has not been revealed, but the motive for these renewed attack is that a war with rival demons has spread Trigon's forces too thinly and left him desperately weak, which forces him to turn his focus on Earth in hopes of creating a new power base.

Three of Trigon's sons, Jacob, Jared and Jesse, play a significant role in his return to life. The brothers have the ability to induce the seven deadly sins in any living being: they can induce wrath (Jared), lust (Jacob) and envy (Jesse). They attempt to open the portal to Trigon's realm, but then betray their father and steal what little power he has left; this actually makes Trigon proud of them for proving to be just as evil as he is. The trio leave, thinking they have gained great power, and Trigon is left trapped in his realm. However, the three brothers then return and corrupt their half-sister, making her their ally. Eventually, they are defeated by Raven and the Titans.

The New 52
In September 2011, The New 52 rebooted DC's continuity. In this new timeline, Trigon makes his post-Flashpoint debut in issue #1 of the Phantom Stranger. In this incarnation, Trigon has an extra set of eyes, giving him six in total. He has struck a bargain with the Stranger to return his offspring Raven (living under the assumed name of Rachel Roth) to him; in return, he pledges to spare Earth from his armies that were ready to search the Earth for her, having already destroyed Azarath years ago. In The New 52, it is revealed that Trigon has at least four children, where Raven is the youngest. Her older brothers are named Belial, Ruskoff, and Suge; Belial is the oldest and most civilized, according to himself, of the three brothers.

Later, Trigon returns to Earth, feeling confident in having swayed Raven to his side during their time together in his demonic realm, where time flows differently. Trigon is shown to be the ruler of six kingdoms known as the Under-Realms, a collective title for the planets and dimensions he conquered, although he has since grown bored with the dull responsibilities of ruling them. At first, he ruled through his own power, then through conquest on the battlefield and finally through subterfuge. His ultimate goal is to unite all seven realms and pass the mantle of leadership to Raven, whom he believes will mold them all in her own image, something only she can do as she has the capacity to love, an emotion Trigon cannot feel or comprehend.

As part of DC Villains Month, Trigon replaced the Teen Titans as the main characters in their book for one issue named #23.1, with Deathstroke taking over #23.2. The Teen Titans book resumed publishing after Villains Month concluded. Though unconfirmed, the Villains Month event leaves Trigon's origins in question. Long ago, in another universe, a trinity of beings called the Divine attempted to eradicate the concept of evil through an item known as the Heart of Darkness. When the Divine return to a world they believed liberated, they find it in utter chaos along with the being they believe to be responsible, only because he appears not to be one of the planet's inhabitants. As they had done billions of times before, they sentence him and his two guards to the Heart of Darkness, hoping that it would consume the evil within them. However, they were horrified when the stranger not only resisted but consumed the Heart of Darkness, absorbing the evils of a billion worlds, and mutating into the being that would become known as Trigon. Now driven by an insatiable hunger for evil, Trigon moves slowly from universe to universe, spreading corruption and sin among the worlds he finds to sate a hunger that knows no end.

Much later, Trigon encounters a woman wearing a suit of armor specifically crafted to counter his immense powers. Though neither is able to slay the other, Trigon is forced to retreat, swearing that members of his blood would return in their thousands to destroy the wearer of the Silent Armor. Trigon has since set his plans into action, only to run into the problem of most of the mothers of his children being unable to survive mating with him, leaving Trigon with only three sons, all of whom he considers failures. Then, one day, he is brought a human woman from Earth, Arella, who gives him his first daughter Raven, the most powerful of Trigon's children, and the reason why Trigon now targets Earth for conquest.

During the DC Rebirth event, Trigon was killed by Bizarro.

Powers and abilities
Trigon is strong enough to gut Ares, the God of War and knock around the members of Superman's Regime, fast enough to keep up with the likes of Superman and Flash and is virtually impervious to most methods of attack having shrugged off attacks from the Teen Titans and reality-warping imp Mister Mxyzptlk. He can fly, teleport himself and others to various locations and can even break through the barriers of other universes with enough power. His common methods of attack are his energy and hellfire blasts. His energy blasts are powerful enough to one-shot both the Teen Titans and the Justice League and his hellfire blasts were strong enough to burn Mister Mxyzptlk. He also likes to attack his enemies with energy blasts fired from his eyes. He's also extremely skilled at using telekinesis, being able to use it on such a scale that he can manipulate the fundamental forces of the universe and distort the space-time continuum. He can additionally manipulate matter, transmute elements and warp reality to the point where he's been able to effortlessly turn the Earth and all its inhabitants into stone, bring people back to life as skeletons and dissipate the atoms of his minion Psimon through light whilst still allowing him to remain conscious. Trigon can also create, summon and materialize dark energy, shape-shift and manipulate his size to either become as tall as a skyscraper or as small as the average man. Being a Demon, Trigon also has a habit for devouring souls but on a massive scale having once devoured the souls of an entire universe. Also in the New 52, Trigon devoured the evil Heart of Darkness artifact which causes him to be hungry for evil and allows him to grow stronger in the presence of evil energies or beings by feeding on their evil. He's also a master of sorcery, being able to fire blasts of mystical eldritch energy at opponents, mind control thousands of beings, cast powerful illusions and even temporarily or permanently grant other beings with superpowers like the time he transformed an ordinary guy into someone with vast psychic powers. When Trigon does get hurt he has a powerful healing factor to fall back on which allows him to regenerate from virtually nothing, though the speed at which he can heal at is unknown. Alongside this, his mind is unblocked to the entire universe meaning he has extensive knowledge of events before they happen and often knows his opponent's next move before said enemy even decides it and is aware of practically everything that is going on in the plane of existence he's in thanks to his upper eyes. So, he essentially is Omniscient.

Other versions
 In the DC Bombshells continuity, Das Trigon was a primal mountain spirit in the German Alps who had a change of heart after his lover Azaria gave birth to his daughter, Rachel. After Azaria's death, Trigon reverts to his monotonous ways and accepts Killer Frost's offer for a place in their new world. Raven has visions of her father's horrendous actions and confronts him in Russia, where he was one of the mythological creatures working for Captain Cold. Raven offers her father a chance at redemption as he aids her in confronting Faora. Faora kills Trigon, resulting in Raven's magic becoming unstable and transforming her into a demonic beast. As she calms down, Faora injects herself with a sample of Raven's unstable demonic blood to become Doomsday.
 Trigon appears in the Injustice: Gods Among Us comics. He is seen when Raven scares away several nomadic tribes in the Sudan, and is mentioned by the alternate Wonder Woman when Diana questions Raven's loyalty. Raven admits that she is Trigon's servant, and not Superman's, and that "all shall bow down before him!" 
 Trigon makes appearances in Tiny Titans as Raven's father and occasional substitute teacher. This version of Trigon is depicted as a silly, bumbling, but devoted father who often walks Raven to school. He enjoys skating wearing silly wigs, barbecuing if he can get the grill going, spending time with Raven and a toddler Kid Devil and he also enjoys surfing with Principal Slade from the school when they leave Lunchlady Darkseid in charge.

In other media

Television

 Trigon appears in Teen Titans, voiced by Keith Szarabajka in the first season and by Kevin Michael Richardson in the fourth season. He serves as the main antagonist of the fourth season. More or less the same as his comic book counterpart, he is evil incarnate and probably the most terrible threat the Teen Titans face. He possesses vast reality manipulation powers, enabling him to reshape the surface of the Earth on a whim, revive the dead, and rip the fabric of space to move across vast distances. He can bring a person's inner darkness to life, creating an exact replica of that person, down to their powers and memories. He also possesses more generic superhuman abilities such as firing energy blasts, creating force fields, and pyrokinesis. In the season one episode "Nevermore", he first appears unnamed and as a manifestation of anger within Raven's mind. As the main antagonist in the fourth season, Trigon reappears with a different appearance. Trigon resurrects Slade Wilson to force Raven into releasing him upon the Earth. In the three-part finale "The End", Trigon finally emerges and destroys the Earth; the Teen Titans are spared by a fraction of Raven's power before releasing Trigon. The Titans and Slade launch an all-out assault on Trigon, but he quickly defeats them. In the end, Raven defeats Trigon using her own strengthened mystical abilities of pure light to obliterate Trigon, undoing the destruction he had caused in the process. It has been mentioned by the show's writers that Trigon was a nightmare of a villain to them due to his near-omnipotent powers, meaning that, realistically, the Teen Titans would stand no chance against the villain if he attacked them. The original 'Terror of Trigon' story contained a solution, due to the writers also being faced with the same problem, and the show adapted it from the comic books.

 Trigon appears in the New Teen Titans segment of DC Nation Shorts, with Kevin Michael Richardson reprising his role. In one short, he arrives at Titans Tower to visit Raven. When Raven tries to shut the door on him, Trigon sticks his huge fingernail in the door's way and gives Raven a stuffed bunny. Raven uses her powers to chop off his fingernail so the door will close and then uses her powers to tear the stuffed bunny to pieces.

 Trigon appears in Teen Titans Go!, voiced again by Kevin Michael Richardson with no connection to the original Teen Titans series. This version is a bumbling dad who wants what is best for his daughter, which is for her to accept her demon heritage and join him in destroying universes. The Teen Titans did not know that Trigon was Raven's father before his debut in "Dog Hand". Trigon's appearances have a reoccurring theme of tempting Raven to embrace her demonic heritage: buttering up his daughter's teammates by giving them new superpowers in "Dog Hand", making Raven jealous by bonding with Starfire in "Caramel Apples", and literally getting in his daughter's head to drive her insane in "Crazy Day".
 Trigon appears in DC Super Hero Girls, voiced once again by Kevin Michael Richardson. While he continues to want Raven to follow in his footsteps and practice dark magic in this version, he is much more forgiving and eventually lets Raven en-roll in Superhero High rather than home school her, eventually taking part in various parent boards and activities as well.

Film
 Trigon appears in Justice League vs. Teen Titans, voiced by Jon Bernthal. This version can create and send demons to possess others, a trait he uses to manipulate the Justice League into attacking the Teen Titans and capture Raven. According to Ra's al Ghul, one of many spirits he controls, Trigon is also responsible for creating the Lazarus Pits. He is eventually defeated by the combined forces of the Teen Titans and the Justice League, with Raven personally fashioning a prison for him out of a crystal shard which she affixes to her forehead; she jokes that this means they can "finally spend some time together".

 Trigon is mentioned in Teen Titans Go! To the Movies. When Robin is sad due not getting his own film, all the Titans remind him how they would have ended had he not enlisted them to be part of the Teen Titans, with Raven mentioning that if she had not been recruited, she would have most likely gone on to enslave many worlds alongside Trigon.

 The Teen Titans Go! and Teen Titans animated series versions of Trigon appear as the main antagonists in Teen Titans Go! vs. Teen Titans with Kevin Michael Richardson reprising the role for both versions and Rhys Darby voicing his Master of Games alias. The 2013 Go! version of Trigon disguises himself as "The Master of Games" and pits the 2013 Titans against the original 2003 animated series versions of the Titans. He uses this as an opportunity to absorb his Raven's demonic powers to resurrect the 2003 Trigon, whom he plans to conquer the multiverse with. However, when his original counterpart continues to mock and blame him for every mistake made, 2013 Trigon absorbs 2003 Trigon and transforms into a being known as Hexagon. With help from Titans throughout the multiverse, the two animated Titans teams are able to take back Raven's powers; destroying the original Trigon once more in the process while the 2013 Trigon was sent to a zombie dimension.

 Trigon appears in Justice League Dark: Apokolips War, voiced by John DiMaggio. Still imprisoned in Raven's crystal shard following his defeat, Trigon attempted to escape; gradually weakening Raven in the process. During the Justice League's second invasion of Apokolips however, he helps her overcome several deadly traps. After Robin dies trying to save his father, Raven's anger eventually releases Trigon from his prison. He possesses Superman, kills Constantine, and battles Darkseid; though Superman breaks free after witnessing Lois Lane's death. Initially weakened, Constantine (now revived) and Raven restore Trigon's physical form and power so he can continue fighting Darkseid, giving the heroes time to escape while Cyborg sacrifices his life to open a Boom Tube that will send Apokolips to oblivion. Before Raven leaves, Trigon thanks Raven for reviving him and bids her well before grabbing Darkseid and plunging themselves into oblivion.

Video games
 Trigon is a playable character in Teen Titans.

 Trigon is featured in DC Universe Online. He and his forces find their way to Earth and end up attacking Metropolis' Tomorrow District. He even takes control of Raven in a plot to destroy the city and captures the other Titan members Starfire, Cyborg, Nightwing and Donna Troy while corrupting them. When the players free the possessed Titans, Trigon's hold on Raven gets stronger, causing the players and the Titans to split up to find Raven. With help from Zatanna, the players end up heading into the portal to Raven's soul self where Trigon uses Raven's possessed spirit to attack the players. After helping Raven fight the last Possessed Raven Spirit, Trigon's evil escapes to Earth. While being brought into Earth by Brother Blood, Trigon then sends his demon minions to corrupt the citizens based on some of the Seven Deadly Sins. Brother Blood's plans to bring Trigon to Earth were thwarted by the players and the Sentinels of Magic. He is served by Demons, Embodiments of Sin, Soul Reavers, Soul Screams, Soul Shadows, Soul Strikers, Possessed Students, and Volatile Succubi. Alternately if you choose the Villain morality, you can help Brother Blood by entering Raven's psyche and destroying her resistance to Trigon which causes him to be unleashed through Raven. Trigon is also a main element in the DLC Pack "Sons of Trigon", in which players are taking to an alternate dimension in which Gotham has become a wasteland and Circe is trying to release Trigon from his prison. Players fight Circe or Wonder Woman in the alert "Trigon´s Prison" in which Trigon himself is a scenery element that, although impossible to damage, will attack the players and summon demons until either boss (Circe or Wonder Woman) has been defeated. The game also shows the other sons of Trigon: Julius (gluttony), James (greed), Jared (lust) and Jack (sloth).

 Trigon appears as a non-playable character in Injustice: Gods Among Us as assistance to Raven's super move. During Wonder Woman's fight with the alternate version of Raven, it is mentioned that the alternate iteration of Superman's victory will hasten Trigon's return. Trigon can also be fought against in the S.T.A.R. Labs missions, making him one of the only unplayable bosses. In addition to these, Trigon also makes an appearance in Scorpion's ending of classic battle where he had summoned Scorpion to the DC Universe.

 Trigon is also featured in the mobile app Teeny Titans, a figure battling game based on Teen Titans Go!. He is one of the characters that player can battle and is also available as two figures that players can battle with and use in the game: one representing his original demonic form and another for his more dad-like incarnation.

 Trigon is a playable character in Lego DC Super-Villains, voiced by Darin De Paul.

Miscellaneous
 A character named Roger Trigon appears in the tie-in novel Arrow: Vengeance based on the Arrow TV series. This version is the head priest of the Church of Blood rather than the demonic entity it worships. Father Trigon founded the Church and found recruits from Starling City's Zandia Orphanage which he was in charge of. Among his recruits were Sebastian Blood and Cyrus Gold aka The Acolyte. Trigon played a huge part in helping Blood rebel against his parents, as well as the one who bestowed Blood with his skull mask. He died before the events of season 2, where Cyrus Gold took over as head of the orphanage while Sebastian Blood started his mayoral campaign (which is revealed to be controlled by Slade Wilson and Isabel Rochev).

 Raven's image of Trigon also made an appearance in Raven's mind in Teen Titans Go! #5.

References

Villains in animated television series
Characters created by George Pérez
Characters created by Marv Wolfman
Comics characters introduced in 1981
DC Comics characters who are shapeshifters
DC Comics characters who can move at superhuman speeds
DC Comics characters who can teleport
DC Comics characters who have mental powers
DC Comics characters who use magic
DC Comics characters with accelerated healing
DC Comics characters with superhuman senses
DC Comics characters with superhuman strength
DC Comics demons
DC Comics deities
DC Comics extraterrestrial supervillains
DC Comics supervillains
DC Comics telekinetics
DC Comics telepaths
Fictional empaths
Fictional gods
Fictional characters who can manipulate darkness or shadows
Fictional characters who can manipulate reality
Fictional characters who can manipulate time
Fictional characters with evocation or summoning abilities
Fictional characters with immortality
Fictional characters with weather abilities
Fictional characters with dimensional travel abilities
Fictional characters with precognition
Fictional characters with energy-manipulation abilities
Fictional characters with anti-magic or power negation abilities
Fictional characters with fire or heat abilities
Fictional characters who can change size
Fictional characters with elemental transmutation abilities
Fictional characters with X-ray vision
Fictional mass murderers
Fictional kings
Fictional rapists
Fictional illusionists
Fictional soul collectors
Fiction about the Devil
Seven deadly sins in popular culture